Arthur Leo Mahan (June 8, 1913 – December 7, 2010) was a professional baseball player, who played as a first baseman in the major leagues for the Philadelphia Phillies during the  season.  Born in Somerville, Massachusetts, he batted and threw left-handed.
 
Mahan played in the Boston Red Sox organization from 1936 until he was sold to the Phillies in April 1940.  He played one season for the Phillies, and posted a .244 batting average (133-for-544) with two home runs and 39 RBI in 146 games played, including 55 runs, 24 doubles and five triples. He hit a double off the wall his first time at bat and led the Phillies in stolen bases. During World War II, Mahan served as a training officer in the United States Navy, working in training cadets.  After the season, Mahan was sold back to his previous minor league team, the Little Rock Travelers of the Southern Association.  He made one last minor league appearance, in 1946 for the Providence Chiefs of the class-B New England League.

A 1936 graduate of Villanova University, Mahan later became their head baseball coach from 1950 until 1972, and athletic director until 1973.

Mahan died on December 7, 2010 in Villanova, Pennsylvania at the age of 97.  Up to the time of his death, he had been recognized as the fourth-oldest living Major League baseball player.

References

External links

Baseball Library
Retrosheet

1913 births
2010 deaths
Major League Baseball first basemen
Philadelphia Phillies players
Rocky Mount Red Sox players
Hazleton Red Sox players
Little Rock Travelers players
Louisville Colonels (minor league) players
Villanova Wildcats athletic directors
Villanova Wildcats baseball coaches
United States Navy officers
Baseball players from Massachusetts
Sportspeople from Somerville, Massachusetts
Military personnel from Massachusetts